Rasikapriya is a rāgam in Carnatic music (musical scale of South Indian classical music). It is the last (72nd) melakarta rāgam in the 72 melakarta rāgam system of Carnatic music. It is called Rasamanjari in Muthuswami Dikshitar school of Carnatic music.

Structure and Lakshana

It is the 6th rāgam in the 12th chakra Aditya. The mnemonic name is Aditya-Sha. The mnemonic phrase is sa ru gu mi pa dhu nu. Its  structure (ascending and descending scale) is as follows (see swaras in Carnatic music for details on below notation and terms):
: 
: 

(the scale uses the notes shatsruthi rishabham, antara gandharam, prati madhyamam, shatsruthi dhaivatham, kakali nishadham)

As it is a melakarta rāgam, by definition it is a sampoorna rāgam (has all seven notes in ascending and descending scale). It is the prati madhyamam equivalent of last suddha madhyamam melakarta, Chalanata, which is the 36th melakarta scale.

Janya rāgams 
Rasikapriya has a few minor janya rāgams (derived scales) associated with it. See List of janya rāgams for full list of scales associated with Rasikapriya.

Compositions
Here are some compositions sung in concerts, set to Rasikapriya.

Arul seyya by Koteeswara Iyer
Pavana tanaya pĀlayamĀm by Dr. M. Balamuralikrishna
Sringara rasamanjarim by Muthuswami Dikshitar
Paripahi pahi by Kuttikkunhi Thangachi
Veena gana priye varnam by Chandrapothar (B. Sasikumar)
Rajatha Sabha Nayakane by Muthiah Bhagavatar

Film Songs

Language:Tamil

Related rāgams
This section covers the theoretical and scientific aspect of this rāgam.

Rasikapriya's notes when shifted using Graha bhedam, yields 2 other major melakarta rāgams, namely, Mayamalavagowla (rāgam using which first lessons are taught to beginners) and Simhendramadhyamam. Graha bhedam is the step taken in keeping the relative note frequencies same, while shifting the shadjam to the next note in the rāgam. For further details and an illustration refer Graha bhedam on Mayamalavagowla.

Notes

References

Melakarta ragas